Freddy Delbaen (born November 21, 1946 in Duffel, Belgium) is a Belgian-Swiss mathematician. He is professor emeritus of financial mathematics at ETH Zurich.

Delbaen made fundamental contributions to the mathematical theory of arbitrage including proving, together with Walter Schachermayer, a general version of the fundamental theorem of asset pricing. He also introduced in a jointly written paper the notion of the risk measure.

His research includes topics in financial mathematics, probability theory, functional analysis and actuarial mathematics.

Life 
Delbaen was born in 1946 in Duffel in the province of Antwerp. He studied mathematics at the Free University of Brussels and received his doctorate there in 1971 under the supervision of Lucien Waelbroeck.

From 1971 to 1995 he was a professor at the Free University of Brussels and at the University of Antwerp. In 1995, Delbaen became a full professor at the ETH Zurich, remaining there until his retirement in 2008. He is still a professor emeritus at ETH and, since 2011, also a guest lecturer at the University of Zurich.

Delbaen is a Fellow of the Institute of Mathematical Statistics since 2011 and the American Mathematical Society since 2013. He is also a member of Academia Europaea since 2020.

Research 
Together with Walter Schachermayer, he proved a general form of the fundamental theorem of asset pricing for (locally) bounded semimartingales, replacing the condition of "no arbitrage" with the term no free lunch with vanishing risk (NFLVR). The two also proved a version for unbounded price processes.

In a joint paper with P. Artzner, J. M. Eber and D. Heath, he introduced the concept of (coherent) risk measure on a finite probability space. Delbaen later generalized the concept to general probability spaces.

Selected publications

Books 
 Monetary Utility Functions (2012). Finance and Insurance, Osaka University Lecture Notes Series. 
 with Walter Schachermayer: The Mathematics of Arbitrage (2005). Springer Finance

References

External links 
 Homepage at ETH Zurich

1946 births
Living people
20th-century Belgian mathematicians
21st-century Belgian mathematicians
20th-century Swiss mathematicians
21st-century Swiss mathematicians
Academic staff of ETH Zurich
Vrije Universiteit Brussel alumni
Fellows of the Institute of Mathematical Statistics
Fellows of the American Mathematical Society